The University of Limpopo is a university in the Limpopo Province, South Africa. It was formed on 1 January 2005, by the merger of the University of the North and the Medical University of South Africa (MEDUNSA). These previous institutions formed the Turfloop and MEDUNSA campuses of the university, respectively. In 2015 the MEDUNSA campus split and became the Sefako Makgatho Health Sciences University.

History
The University of the North, nicknamed "Turfloop" after its location, was established in 1959 under the apartheid regime's policy of separate ethnically-based institutions of higher learning policy. The town that grew around the university was named Sovenga, for the three ethnic groups (Sotho, Venda, Tsonga) that Apartheid ideology intended to study there. In reality, most inhabitants refer to the town as Mankweng, after one of the chiefs of the area. Under later apartheid, the University of the North served as a "model" university where dignitaries were brought to show the "viability" of the separate facilities. As such, it received heavy government subsidies, but the real problem was that the students that the university supposedly served were so under-resourced in their standard education that the quality of instruction was placed under incredible demands.

The university was a centre of resistance to apartheid in the 1960s, 70s, and 80s with the SADF occupying the grounds often during those years. After the end of apartheid, the university struggled through various re-organization and rationalization schemes, yet always managed to survive. Enrollment fluctuated wildly in the years after liberation and while some faculty did not transition very easily, others were able to seize upon the new opportunities.

The University of Limpopo is the result of a merger between the former Medical University of Southern Africa and the University of the North, which occurred on 1 January 2005.

The extension of University Education Act of 1959 made provision for the establishment of racially exclusive universities for black South Africans. Under the provisions of the Act, the University College of the North was established about thirty kilometres from the Limpopo Province town of Polokwane on 1 August 1959. The College was placed under the academic trusteeship of the University of South Africa. This formative relationship was maintained until the South African Parliament promulgated the University of the North Act (Act No. 47 of 1969) thus bringing to an end the College status as of 1 January 1970.

The Academic marvel is located in the foothills of the Hwiti (Wolkberg range) in Mankweng township, midway between Polokwane and  Tzaneen.

Faculties

Humanities

School of Languages and Communication Studies
School of Social Sciences
School of Education
School of Policing

Management and Law

School of Law
School of Accountancy (SoA)
School of Economics and Management
Turfloop Graduate School of Leadership

Science and Agriculture

School of Physical and Mineral Sciences
School of Molecular and Life Sciences
School of Agricultural and Environmental Sciences
School of Mathematical and Computer Sciences

Health Sciences

School of Medicine
School of Health Science

Ranking

Notable alumni
Frank Chikane
Solly Malatsi
Cyril Ramaphosa
Ongkopotse Tiro
Pansy Tlakula
Hans Daniel Namuhuja
Priscillah Mabelane
Lazarus Chakwera
Conny Nxumalo

References

External links
University of Limpopo website
Turfloop campus website (previously University of the North website)
Medunsa campus website (previously Medunsa website)

 
Universities in Limpopo
Public universities in South Africa
Educational institutions established in 2005
2005 establishments in South Africa